Iviraiva is a genus of South American tree trunk spiders that was first described by C. A. Rheims & Antônio Brescovit in 2004.  it contains only two species: I. argentina and I. pachyura.

References

Araneomorphae genera
Hersiliidae
Spiders of South America
Taxa named by Antônio Brescovit